The M96 is a short metropolitan route in Greater Johannesburg, South Africa. The entire route is within the CBD of Kempton Park and consists of two one-way streets (Amon Ngulele Road, formerly Voortrekker Road, westwards & Long Street eastwards).

Route 
The M96's eastern terminus is an interchange with the R21 Highway adjacent to the freight entrance of O. R. Tambo International Airport. It goes westwards as Amon Ngulele Road, formerly Voortrekker Road, through the Kempton Park CBD, passing under the M32 Road (Petrus “Chilly” Magagula Road), intersecting with Monument Road (M91 Road) and bypassing the Kempton Square Shopping Centre, to end at a junction with the M57 Road (Pretoria Road) just south of the Kempton Park Civic Centre.

Amon Ngulele Road is a one-way-street westwards from the R21 interchange to the M57 junction and Long Street is a one-way-street in the other direction, from the M57 junction to the R21 interchange.

References 

Streets and roads of Johannesburg
Metropolitan routes in Johannesburg